Christopher Hudson may refer to:

Chris Hudson (American football) (born 1971), American football player
Sydney Hudson (Christopher Sydney Hudson, 1900–?), British alpine skier
Chris Hudson (trade unionist), Irish trade unionist and Unitarian minister
Christopher Wayne Hudson (born 1978), Australian gang member involved in the 2007 Melbourne CBD shootings
Christopher Hudson, member of the Beefsteak Club (London)
Christopher Hudson, American leader of Seventh-day Adventist group Forerunner Chronicles, mentor to Angus T. Jones
Christopher Hudson, author who wrote the book of the film The Killing Fields
Christopher Hudson, father of the character Finn Hudson on the American TV series Glee

See also
Christie Hudson, birth name of American model Christie Brinkley